Ambrosoli is a surname. Notable people with the name include:

Daniela Ambrosoli (born 1941), Swiss entrepreneur, philanthropist, founder and president of the Pierino Ambrosoli Foundation
Giorgio Ambrosoli (1933–1979), Italian lawyer
Giuseppe Ambrosoli (1923– 1987), Italian Roman Catholic priest
Umberto Ambrosoli (born  1971), Italian politician

See also
Dr. Ambrosoli Memorial Hospital, Hospital in Northern Uganda
Pierino Ambrosoli Foundation, Foundation based in Switzerland

Given names

it:Ambrosoli